Harlan Hoge Ballard ( – ) was an American author.  He was founder of the Agassiz Association and served as librarian of the Berkshire Athenaeum for 46 years.

Life 
He was the son of the Rev. Addison Ballard and Julia Perkins Ballard, a writer of nature books and temperance fiction. Ballard attended public school in Athens and Detroit, Michigan and graduated from Williams College in 1874.

Upon graduating, he became principal of Lenox High School until 1880 and principal of Lenox Academy from 1880 to 1886.

In 1903 he was appointed the first curator of the Berkshire Museum of Natural History and Art. He remained as curator until early 1931, giving up the position when the museum and library became separate institutions.

In 1875, he founded the Agassiz Association, an organization dedicated to the promotion of natural science, especially among young people.  By the 1890s, membership numbered over 20,000 people.

On August 20, 1879, he married Lucy Bishop Pike.

In 1886, he left teaching for literary efforts.  He edited The Swiss Cross, the Agassiz Association monthly magazine, and the newspaper the New York Observer.  He published numerous books, including a translation of Virgil's Aeneid (1930).

He became librarian of the Berkshire Athenaeum on November 1, 1888.  He also served as President of the Western Massachusetts Library Club.

Harlan Hoge Ballard died of a heart attack on 18 February 1934 in Pittsfield.  He was survived by his wife, a son, and two daughters.  A memorial fund was established in his name by his daughter, in about 1952.

Works 
His published works include:

 Three Kingdoms
 World of Nature
 Open Sesame
 One Thousand Blunders in English
 Barnes Readers
 The Tyler's Jewel

References 

Created via preloaddraft
1853 births
1934 deaths
American librarians
American writers
American translators
People from Athens, Ohio
Writers from Detroit
Williams College alumni